Shafia Zubair is an Indian politician from Rajasthan and a member of the Indian National Congress. She was elected as a member of the Legislative Assembly of Rajasthan from Ramgarh, Alwar on 31 January 2019. She defeated her nearest rival from BJP by a margin of 12,221 votes. She is the wife of All India Congress Committee Secretary Zubair Khan. Shafia Zubair was previously the Zila Pramukh of Alwar (2010-2015) from Indian National Congress.

References

Indian National Congress politicians from Rajasthan
Living people
1967 births